Mycosphaerella arachidis is a fungal plant pathogen.

See also
 List of Mycosphaerella species. Mycosphaerella arachidis is the seldom found teleomorph stage of Cercospora arachidicola affecting peanuts.

References

arachidis
Fungal plant pathogens and diseases
Fungi described in 1938